The Shire of Balmoral is a former local government area of Queensland, Australia, located in eastern Brisbane.

History

The Bulimba Division was one of the original divisions created on 11 November 1879 under the Divisional Boards Act 1879. On 19 January 1888, the No. 1 subdivision of Bulimba Division was separated to create Balmoral Division.

On 17 March 1892, there was an alteration of boundaries. The Pritchard's Road land and gravel reserve (100 acres) were transferred from Kianawah Division (later renamed Wynnum Division) to Balmoral Division, while the Grassdale Estate land was transferred from Kianawah Division to Bulimba Division.

The Local Authorities Act 1902 replaced all Divisions with Towns and Shires, so the Balmoral Division became the Shire of Balmoral on 31 March 1903.

On 1 October 1925, the shire was amalgamated into the City of Brisbane.

Chairmen
The chairmen of the Balmoral Shire Council were:
 1888–1890: Edward Griffith (brother of Samuel Griffith)
 1891: James Nuttall
 1892: Alexander Kelly
 1893: C. F. Uhlmann
 1894: T. Penlington
 1895: E. Stanton
 1896–1897: R. Jamieson
 1898–1899: A. C. H. Rossiter
 1900: E. Stanton
 1901–1902: E. K. Russell
 1903–1904: W. Icke
 1905: A. Stirling
 1906: R. J. Mulvey
 1907: J. Congreve
 1908: P. G. Donovan
 1909: E. Stanton
 1911: John Watson
 1912–1913: E. Stanton
 1914: 
 1915:
 1916–1917: A. Harrison 
 1918:
 1919:
 1920–1925: A. Harrison

References

Former local government areas of Queensland
Brisbane
1888 establishments in Australia
1925 disestablishments in Australia